The Church of the Blessed Virgin Mary may refer to:

 Church of the Blessed Virgin Mary, Emborough, Somerset, England
 Church of the Blessed Virgin Mary, Huish Episcopi, Somerset, England
 Church of the Blessed Virgin Mary, Staré, Slovakia.
 Church of the Blessed Virgin Mary, Verkhneye Myackovo, Russia
 Church of the Blessed Virgin Mary, the Queen of Peace, Sweet Home, Lavaca County, Texas, United States
 Collegiate Church of the Blessed Virgin Mary and St Anne, Glasgow, Scotland
 Cathedral Church of the Blessed Virgin Mary & St Chad, Lichfield (commonly known as Lichfield Cathedral), England
 Cathedral Church of the Blessed Virgin Mary of Lincoln (commonly known as Lincoln Cathedral), England
 Cathedral and Parish Church of the Blessed Virgin Mary (commonly known as Southwell Minster), England

See also 
 St Mary's Church (disambiguation)